The Directorate General of GST Intelligence (DGGI) is a law enforcement agency  under the Ministry of Finance responsible for fighting tax evasion in India. It was founded in 1979 as the Directorate General of Anti-Evasion and was later renamed the Directorate General of Central Excise Intelligence. The agency was renamed as Directorate General of GST Intelligence (DGGI) after the introduction of the Goods and Services Tax. The agency is part of NATGRID. The organisation is staffed by officers of Central Board of Indirect Taxes and Customs.

See also
 Taxation in India
 Directorate of Revenue Intelligence
 Central Economic Intelligence Bureau

References

External links
 Official website of DGGI

Tax evasion in India